Dawood Ali Najafi (February 17, 1968) is a politician in Afghanistan. He is serving as Minister of Transport and Civil Aviation, a position he held since June 2010. Son of Salman Ali, Najafi lived in Pakistan as an Afghan refugee. He received a MBBS from University of Balochistan and an MA in Islamic Studies from University of Peshawar. He also has some working experience with an agency of the United Nations in Pakistan. Najafi returned to Afghanistan in recent years to work for the government. He is fluent in Dari-Persian, Urdu, Pashto and English. Najafi belongs to the Hazara ethnic group.

See also 
 List of Hazara people
 Cabinet of Afghanistan
Ministry of Transport and Civil Aviation (Afghanistan)

References 

Aviation ministers of Afghanistan
Transport ministers of Afghanistan
Hazara politicians
1968 births
Living people
Afghan expatriates in Pakistan
University of Balochistan alumni
University of Peshawar alumni